James Hadley (August 1837 – 23 December 1903) was an English potter and artist associated with the Worcester Royal Porcelain Company. Until 1895 his work was  produced almost exclusively by Royal Worcester; he later set  up his own factory.

Life
In the 1850s Hadley was apprenticed to Kerr and Binns of Worcester,  proprietors of the Royal Worcester porcelain factory, where he worked in the modelling department. By 1870 he had become principal modeller there. In 1875, he left the company and set up his own modelling studio  in Worcester High Street. Although no longer directly employed by  Royal Worcester  he sold almost his complete output of models for ornamental vases and figures to them.

He has been described by John Sandon as "probably the finest English modeller of all time" Able to work in any form or style required, he is best known for his decorative figures, made in the 1870s and 1880s, when taste was shifting towards coloured models from the previous fashion for plain white Parian Ware.

One of his most famous works was the "Aesthetic Teapot", modelled for Worcester after a design by R.W. Binns. Satirising Oscar Wilde and the aesthetic movement, it is formed as a soulful young man wearing a sunflower on one side, and  lovelorn maiden with lily on the other; despite its sculptural form, it still functioned as a teapot.

Hadley's contract to supply models to Royal Worcester was ended in November 1895 due to a decline in the luxury end of the market.  For  a while he rented some factory space at Shrub Hill, Worcester from Edward Locke, with whom he had worked at Royal Worcester . Then, in 1897, with the support of   business partner Frank Littledale, Hadley set up a factory at Diglis Road in the city on land owned by his family. In 1900 Hadley & Sons became a limited company with the shares owned by Hadley and his four sons,  and by Frank Littledale.

Hadley died in 1903. In June 1905  Royal Worcester purchased his factory. Production of his wares was transferred to main site in Severn Street, Worcester, the next year.

References

Sources

1837 births
1903 deaths
English potters